HMAS Paluma (A 01) is the lead ship of the Paluma-class survey motor launches operated by the Royal Australian Navy (RAN).

Design and construction

The Paluma-class vessels have a full load displacement of 320 tonnes. Propulsion machinery consists of two General Motors Detroit Diesel 12V-92T engines, which supply  to the two propeller shafts.

The sensor suite of a Paluma-class launch consists of a Kelvin Hughes 1007 navigational radar and Thales Petrel three-dimensional forward looking active high frequency echosounders. The vessels are unarmed. The standard ship's company consists of three officers and eleven sailors, although another four personnel can be accommodated. The catamarans were originally painted white, but were repainted naval grey in 2002.

Paluma was laid down by Eglo Engineering on 21 March 1988, launched on 6 February 1989 and commissioned into the RAN on 27 February 1989. The ship was named for Paluma, Queensland.

Operational history
In January 2011, Paluma was one of three RAN vessels deployed to survey Moreton Bay and the Brisbane River for submerged debris as part of Operation Queensland Flood Assist, the Australian Defence Force response to the 2010–11 Queensland floods.

Citations

References

Paluma-class survey motor launches
Survey ships of the Royal Australian Navy
Naval ships of Australia
1989 ships